Long Island MacArthur Airport  (colloquially referred to as MacArthur Airport, MacArthur, or by its original name, Islip Airport) is a public airport in Ronkonkoma in the Town of Islip, on Long Island, in New York, United States. The Town of Islip owns and operates the airport, which serves about two million airline passengers a year, as well as general aviation. Long Island MacArthur Airport (LIMA) covers 1,311 acres (531 ha) and has three runways and two helipads.

MacArthur Airport serves Nassau and Suffolk counties as an alternative to John F. Kennedy and LaGuardia airports – both of which are located in the Borough of Queens in New York City. Shuttle buses connect the airport to the Long Island Rail Road's Ronkonkoma station.

The FAA designated LIMA an Official Metro Airport in early 2011, meaning it is now grouped with LaGuardia, JFK, and Newark in travel and informational searches for New York airports, providing better exposure. MacArthur Airport does not share the congested airspace of the city-centric airports and has an exceptional record of on-time performance. In 2009, 83.6% of flights arrived on time and 85.6% of flights departed on time.

In 2017 the airport served more than 1.29 million airline passengers. In 2016 it had 124,154 aircraft operations, an average of 340 per day; 84% general aviation; 7% scheduled airline; 6% air taxi and 2% military. In July 2018, 247 aircraft were based at Islip: 141 single-engine, 30 multi-engine, 36 jets, 31 helicopters, and 9 military. The Town-owned Foreign Trade Zone is next to the airport property.

MacArthur Airport was originally named Islip Airport, and following General Douglas MacArthur's world-famous escape from the Philippines, it was renamed in his honor.

History

Early years 
In April 1942 the Town of Islip contracted with the federal government to build an airfield on town-owned land for military use.  Within months the Civil Aeronautics Administration – the predecessor to today's Federal Aviation Administration – funded construction of three paved runways. Originally named Islip Airport, at the suggestion of Charles H. Duryea, a local elected official, the airport was renamed MacArthur Airport after General Douglas MacArthur, whose dramatic escape from the Philippines had captured the attention of the world.

In 1944 Lockheed Aircraft Corporation built the first hangar at the airport. Five years later the Town built the airport's first terminal building preparing for airline flights. Through the 1950s the Sperry Corporation conducted aerospace research at the airport.

In 1947, the Town of Islip offered the airport to the Port of New York Authority (now the Port Authority of New York & New Jersey). The offer was rejected because of the airport's location outside of the port region.

Commercial service era
In 1960, Allegheny Airlines was the first scheduled passenger airline at Islip, flying to Boston, Philadelphia, and Washington, D.C.. The March 1961 Official Airline Guide lists five weekday Convair 440 departures: a nonstop to Washington National, one to Baltimore, and three flights direct to Boston via several stops. The General Douglas MacArthur Terminal was completed in 1966.  In 1967 Mohawk Airlines began two Fairchild Hiller FH-227 flights a day, to Bridgeport and Albany and beyond with one flight continuing to Toronto. By 1969 Mohawk was flying BAC One-Elevens nonstop to Syracuse.  In 1972 Mohawk had nonstops to Albany with direct service to Buffalo and Rochester.  Mohawk would soon be merged into Allegheny Airlines.

In 1971 American Airlines began flying nonstop Boeing 727-100s to Chicago O'Hare Airport.  By 1974 Allegheny had started BAC One-Elevens and McDonnell Douglas DC-9-30s nonstop to Albany and Washington D.C. National Airport, and direct jets to Burlington, VT, Cincinnati and Detroit. Allegheny continued operating Convair 580s nonstop to Albany, Boston, Bridgeport and Washington D.C. in addition to direct Convair 580s to Buffalo and Rochester. Allegheny would be renamed USAir, which then became US Airways, with these respective airlines operating service into the airport for many years before US Airways was merged into American.

The Official Airline Guide (OAG) shows the following passenger jets to Long Island MacArthur nonstop from the following at various times from the late 1960s to the late 1990s, with types:

 Allegheny Airlines:  Albany, NY, New Haven, CT, Washington, D.C. National Airport –  BAC One-Eleven, McDonnell Douglas DC-9-30
 American:  Chicago O'Hare Airport, Raleigh/Durham, NC – Boeing 727-100, Boeing 727-200, Fokker 100, McDonnell Douglas MD-80
 Braniff International Airlines:  Orlando, FL – Boeing 727-200
 Carnival Air Lines:  Fort Lauderdale, FL, Fort Myers, FL, Orlando, FL, Tampa, FL, West Palm Beach, FL – Boeing 737-400
 Continental:  Washington, D.C. Dulles International Airport – Boeing 737-300
 Delta Express:  Fort Lauderdale, FL, Orlando, FL, Tampa, FL – Boeing 737-200
 Eastern Airlines:  Atlanta, GA, Fort Lauderdale, FL, Orlando, FL, Providence, RI – Boeing 727-100, Boeing 727-200
Mohawk Airlines:  Syracuse, NY – BAC One-Eleven
 New York Air:  Washington, D.C. Dulles International Airport - McDonnell Douglas DC-9-30 
 Northeastern International Airways:  Boston, MA, Fort Lauderdale, FL, Hartford, CT, Orlando, FL, Philadelphia, PA, St. Petersburg, FL, West Palm Beach, FL – Boeing 727-100, Boeing 727-200, Douglas DC-8
 Spirit Airlines:  Detroit, MI, Fort Lauderdale, FL, Fort Myers, FL, Tampa, FL, West Palm Beach, FL – McDonnell Douglas MD-80, McDonnell Douglas MD-87
 United:  Chicago O'Hare Airport – Boeing 727-100, Boeing 727-200
 USAir:  Albany, NY, Baltimore, MD, Charlotte, NC, Fort Lauderdale, FL, Orlando, FL, Pittsburgh, PA, Syracuse, NY, Washington, D.C. National Airport – Boeing 727-200, Boeing 737-200, Boeing 737-300, Boeing 737-400, BAC One-Eleven, Fokker F28, Fokker 100, McDonnell Douglas DC-9-30

Southwest Airlines arrived at Islip in 1999 with nonstop Boeing 737-700s to Baltimore, MD, Chicago Midway Airport, Nashville, TN, and Tampa, FL.

Most of the above airlines ceased serving Long Island MacArthur, but between 1999 and 2009 passenger traffic grew with the airport, and now serves about two million passengers a year on three airlines: Southwest Airlines, Frontier Airlines, and Breeze Airways (American Eagle's twice daily service to Philadelphia, PA ceased on September 6, 2022 due to a pilot shortage)

A number of commuter and regional airlines served the airport from the late 1970s to the late 1990s, including Allegheny Commuter, Altair Airlines, Atlantic Coast Airlines operating as United Express, Business Express Airlines operating as Delta Connection, Continental Express, Empire Airlines (1976-1985), Mall Airways, Metro Airlines Northeast operating as Trans World Express, Mohawk Airlines (a later commuter air carrier version), NewAir and its predecessor New Haven Airways, Piedmont Regional Airlines operating on behalf of Piedmont Airlines (1948-1989), Pilgrim Airlines, Precision Airlines operating as Northwest Airlink, Ransome Airlines and USAir Express and its successor US Airways Express. According to the OAG, prop types operated by these smaller airlines to the airport included the ATR-42, Beechcraft 99, Beechcraft 1900C, BAe Jetstream 31, de Havilland Canada DHC-6 Twin Otter, de Havilland Canada DHC-7 Dash 7, de Havilland Canada DHC-8 Dash 8, Dornier 228, Embraer EMB-110 Bandeirante, Nord 262, Piper Navajo, Saab 340, Short 330, Short 360 and Swearingen Metro.

In 1994 Continental Express was operating ATR-42s nonstop between the airport and the Continental Airlines hub at Newark Airport. By 1999 Atlantic Southeast Airlines (ASA) flying as Delta Connection was operating Canadair CRJ-200s nonstop to the Delta Air Lines hub in Atlanta while Comair, also flying as Delta Connection, was operating Canadair CRJ-200s nonstop to Delta's hub in Cincinnati. Also in 1999, Continental Express was flying Embraer ERJ-145s nonstop to the Continental Airlines hub in Cleveland.

In later years Continental Express continued to serve the airport with nonstop regional jets to Cleveland while Continental Connection scheduled nonstop turboprops to Albany, NY; both services ended in 2005. Spirit Airlines scheduled flights to several Florida cities and Detroit, before moving to LaGuardia Airport in 2001; in May 2008 the airline resumed service to Fort Lauderdale from MacArthur, dropping it soon after. Delta Express, which had nonstops to Orlando and Fort Lauderdale, dropped MacArthur Airport in 2003 after a decline in traffic. Delta Connection regional jet service to Atlanta flown by Atlantic Southeast Airlines (ASA) on behalf of Delta Air Lines ended on May 1, 2008, following a mid-April announcement that Delta and Northwest Airlines were planning to merge – a move that led to changes for the merged airline.

As of December 2022, Southwest is operated year-round, non-stop service to Baltimore, Fort Lauderdale, Orlando, Tampa, Nashville, and West Palm Beach. Allegiant Air previously operated two weekly flights on a seasonal basis to Fort Myers/Punta Gorda, FL. using McDonnell Douglas MD-80s but no longer serves the airport. PenAir began operating two daily nonstop flights to Boston in July 2013, but stopped flying to MacArthur a year later. The last legacy carrier to serve Islip was American Airlines with Embraer ERJ-145 code share flights operated by its American Eagle Airlines regional affiliate Piedmont Airlines to Philadelphia. Service to Washington–National ended on July 2, 2014, after the merger between US Airways and American. The newly merged airline had to cut service to 17 cities from Washington–National because of an antitrust lawsuit preventing the airline from monopolizing slots at National Airport. American Airlines reapplied for nonstop service between MacArthur Airport and Washington–National when two slots opened up, but in early 2015 the airline lost the bid for these two slots. In September 2022, American Airlines ended service to Islip citing a regional pilot shortage as the main reason behind the cut. 

Frontier Airlines began serving MacArthur Airport in 2017, and Breeze Airways began service to and from the airport in 2022.

Passenger boardings and operations 
Following the September 11, 2001 attacks MacArthur Airport saw a 25% decrease in passenger traffic. Passenger traffic later increased, but they decreased again in 2006. Charts depicting annual operations and passenger boardings are in Appendix C and D. In 2005 MacArthur Airport had 173,135 total operations; during this year 1,055,832 passenger were enplaned, 7.07% more than 2004. In 2006 MacArthur had 189,390 total operations with 1,138,061 passenger boardings. The year 2007 brought total operations at MacArthur down to 184,760 but passenger boardings increased to 1,167,515, MacArthur's highest boardings in the last 6 years. In 2008, total operations at MacArthur were 179,230 and passenger boardings were down to 1,048,768; in 2009, 159,736 total operations and 929,902 passenger boardings. From 2005 to 2009 almost every category of MacArthur's operations has declined: airline, military, air taxi, and general aviation. A recent figure was released citing a 46.4% decrease from 2007 to 2012, the most loss in any small hub airport.

Growth in the 21st century 

Established about midway through the 20th century, by the end of the century MacArthur Airport had been transformed. Growth and expansion continued in the early years of the 21st century, but by 2014 the airport was experiencing financial difficulties.

In 2004 MacArthur Airport embarked on an expansion that included a Southwest Airlines terminal built by the airline at a cost of $65 million. Phase one of the expansion included four gates to be used by Southwest, as well as space for shops and restaurants. Phase two, completed in November 2006, added four more gates for a total of eight new gates. Prior to the expansion project, passengers had to pass back through the ticketing area of the airport to reach the baggage claim area. With the completion of Phase two, the new concourse provided a more convenient exit point to baggage claim, ground transportation, and the airport's roadway exit. Nevertheless, the location of the baggage claim area still requires most travelers using the airport's long-term parking lots to pass back through the ticketing area of the airport to reach their vehicles.

A major proponent of the airport's 2004–2006 expansion projects was Peter J. McGowan, then the Islip Town Supervisor; the new concourse was named after McGowan. The terminal was renamed Veterans Memorial Concourse in homage to Long Island's distinction as home to more military veterans than almost any other community in the United States.

The 2004 expansion was built without state approvals and in violation of fire and safety codes, which resulted in a scandal.

In late September 2007, Ryanair, an ultra-low cost airline based in Ireland, proposed to fly between MacArthur Airport and Dublin, Ireland. The proposal was ultimately called off.

A new control tower was completed in 2010 and opened in 2011 to replace the tower built in the early sixties. In, 2010 MacArthur Airport also saw the construction of a new, state-of-the-art Fuel Farm, which would increase the airport's jet fuel supply. The airport soon thereafter reconfigured the roadway in front of the terminal; another taxiway was also constructed along with other projects using FAA airport improvement program funds. Development of the West Side, home to a thriving general aviation sector, was to be underway in late 2010.

While the airport continues to expand it has added numerous amenities, including free courtesy cell phone parking (located in the rear of Lot 6B). In November 2009 MacArthur Airport became the only airport in the tri-state region to offer free wireless Internet service in the entire terminal and in the courtesy cell phone parking lot. In addition, the airport launched several tools designed to provide up-to-date information to travelers, including its first official website, flyLIMA.com. All passenger food catering within the airport terminal is provided by HMSHost, which operates five restaurants.

In March 2017, plans were announced to build a U.S. Customs Station at MacArthur Airport by the end of 2019 with help from financial assistance from New York State Governor Andrew Cuomo – an attempt at making MacArthur an international destination and at enticing airlines to add MacArthur to their destinations. Beginning in late March, a marketing campaign was to be undertaken by the Town of Islip to announce the revival of the airport, including through advertisements on public transportation, digital marketing, and radio spots. In years past, previous campaigns have targeted airlines. This time, the $180 million campaign focus is on potential passengers and commuters. Additionally, a new logo and slogan were unveiled. The thought process is that by attracting more passengers, the airport will attract more airlines, including international flights.

On July 17, 2017, Frontier Airlines announced service to 10 new cities using aircraft as large as the Airbus A321, which approaches the Boeing 757 in range and passenger capacity – a first for the airport in that past decade.

In September 2022, American Airlines ended service to MacArthur from Philadelphia due to pilot shortages. Also taking place in 2022 was the opening of a new ground transportation center at the airport. This state-of-the-art facility houses all of the rental car agencies present on-site at the airport.

Airlines and destinations

MacArthur Airport currently has two concourses in one main terminal. Concourse A has nine gates, while Concourse B has two gates with jetways and multiple gates that board from the ramp.

Passenger

Statistics

Passenger numbers

Top destinations

Carrier shares

Administration

Long Island MacArthur Airport is owned and operated by the Town of Islip. The Department of Aviation is led by the Commissioner of Aviation and Transportation, which works closely with the Town Board to manage and steward the airport. Departments include Airport Operations, Custodial, Fire Rescue, Law Enforcement, Maintenance, Construction, and Administration.

Tenants

Long Island MacArthur Airport's houses numerous general aviation tenants, including three fixed based operators: Sheltair Aviation, ExcelAire, and Mid Island Air, which offers a full range of general aviation services. There are numerous flight schools based on the field, including ATP Flight School, Heritage Flight Academy, and Mid Island Air Service.

The Suffolk County Police (SCPD) Aviation Section has a law enforcement and MEDEVAC helicopter based at MacArthur Airport. The base is staffed 24 hours a day by police pilots, as well as flight paramedics employed by the Stony Brook University Medical Center.

Until the early 1990s, the 2nd Battalion (Attack), 142nd Aviation Regiment of the N.Y. Army National Guard's 42nd Infantry Division Aviation Brigade, was based at MacArthur Airport, equipped with Bell Helicopter AH-1 Cobra (F model) gunships. In 2006, the 3rd Battalion (Assault), 142nd Aviation Regiment moved its headquarters from Latham, N.Y. to Long Island MacArthur Airport, bringing its Sikorsky UH-60L Black Hawk helicopters. In May 2007, following yet another reorganization in which the battalion was re-configured, the unit received its mobilization alert order to participate in Operation Iraqi Freedom. Over the course of their deployment, the unit – which came to be known as Task Force Jester – flew more than 15,000 flight hours. The last of the battalion's troops returned home to Long Island MacArthur Airport in May 2009.

It is also home to Civil Air Patrol's Long Island Group's Suffolk Cadet Squadron 10.

Radio station WRCN-FM (Broadcasting as LI News) maintains its offices and studios within the airport.

Additionally, the New York Air Route Traffic Control Center (ZNY) – known as an ARTCC for short – is located at the airport.

Accidents and incidents
On April 4, 1955, a Douglas DC-6 of United Airlines operating on a pilot test flight bound for LaGuardia Airport lost control soon after take-off and subsequently crashed, killing all three crew members on board. 
On November 23, 1999, a U.S. Army National Guard UH-1H "Huey" helicopter crashed in fog during an attempted landing after training exercises above eastern Long Island; two were killed and two injured.
On July 25, 2008, a bomb threat was received for Southwest Airlines Flight 2622, bound for Chicago. Subsequently, Concourse A was evacuated for several hours and a thorough search of the airplane and building commenced, which led to no dangerous item to be found.
On January 7, 2011, a Bombardier Dash 8-100 operating as Piedmont Airlines Flight 4507 on behalf of American Airlines, with service from Philadelphia, PA to New Haven, CT, had to divert to MacArthur after being struck by lightning over the Long Island Sound, causing electrical problems. The diversion was successful and the 33 passengers were bussed up to New Haven.
On February 3, 2022, a Pilatus PC12 collided with a Hawker 1000 on the ramp. No one was injured. The investigation is still ongoing as of December 2022.

Ground transportation

MacArthur Airport is connected with the nearby Long Island Rail Road station at Ronkonkoma by shuttle buses and taxi service. The LIRR offers passengers transportation to nearby New York City. The LIRR currently offers a discount package for airport passengers, which includes the cost of shuttle service between the train station and airport terminal.

Suffolk Transit's S57 bus route serves the airport, connecting it with Sayville to the south and the Smith Haven Mall, located in Lake Grove, to the north. The S57 also stops at the Ronkonkoma LIRR station.

The Hampton Jitney's Westhampton, Montauk, and North Fork lines stop along the Long Island Expressway (Interstate 495) at Exit 60. It is called the Islip Airport Connection, and is a short taxicab ride away from the airport terminal.

In popular culture
Long Island MacArthur Airport has been used several times as a filming location:

 In the 1970s film The Out-of-Towners, the airport scene, in which George Kellerman (Jack Lemmon) and his wife Gwen (Sandy Dennis) depart Ohio for New York.
 In 2008, several scenes for the independent film Every Day, starring Helen Hunt, Liev Schreiber, and Brian Dennehy.
 Scenes for the 2010 FX comedy Louie were filmed at the airport.
 In 2011, Sean Paul's music video She Doesn't Mind was filmed at the airport.
 In 2012, part of the movie Non-Stop was filmed in various locations at the airport.
 In 2014, scenes from Ricki and the Flash were filmed at the airport.

See also
 Transportation on Long Island
 Transportation in New York City

References

External links

 
 
 

Airports in Suffolk County, New York
Airports established in 1944
Brookhaven, New York
Islip (town), New York
1944 establishments in New York (state)